The wheel hub motor (also called wheel motor, wheel hub drive,  hub motor or in-wheel motor) is an electric motor that is incorporated into the hub of a wheel and drives it directly.

History

 Wellington Adams of St. Louis conceived of building an electric motor directly in the vehicle wheel, though it was attached via complicated gearing.
 An early wheel hub electric motor was invented by Frenchman Charles Theryc and patented in 1896 as  entitled Wheel with Electric Motor hub for Vehicles. The patent cites no transmission losses thanks to an absence of classic transmission rods from engines to wheels.
 C F Goddard in 1896 patented in  a piston hub motor for horseless carriages, powered by expanding gas of some kind. His off-center flexible bent spoke designs later appeared in the Apollo moon rovers' wheels in the 1960s.
 In  W C Smith in 1897 developed another explosive gas expansion motor inside a wheel hub that utilized cams on a track in the hub to transmit power to the wheel.

The electric wheel hub motor was raced by Ferdinand Porsche in 1897 in Vienna, Austria. Porsche's first engineering training was electrical, not internal combustion based. As a result, he developed his first cars as electric cars with electric wheel hub motors that ran on batteries. The Lohner Porsche, fitted with one wheel motor in each of the front wheels, appeared at the World Exhibition in Paris in 1900 and created a sensation in the young automobile world. In the following years, 300 Lohner Porsches were made and sold to wealthy buyers.

Eventually the growth in power of the gasoline engine overtook the power of the electric wheel hub motors and this made up for any losses through a transmission. As a result, autos moved to gasoline engines with transmissions, but they were never as efficient as electric wheel hub motors.

Uses in current and future vehicles
 They are commonly found on electric bicycles and motorcycles.
 Wheel motors are applied in industry, e.g. driving wheels that are part of assembly lines.
 Tyre makers and component producers have developed them and the first production car to use them was the Luka EV by MW Motors.
 Hub motors can also be found on buses.

, at least three companies are planning to release production vehicles with wheel hub motors in 2021:
 Aptera Motors has announced the highly efficient Aptera, a solar powered, enclosed three wheeler using hub motors from the company, Elaphe.
 Lightyear has announced a solar powered automobile using hub motors, the Lightyear 0.
 Lordstown Motors has announced 4 wheel drive pickup truck, the Lordstown Endurance, with motors from Elaphe.

Concept cars

Several concept cars have been developed using in-wheel motors:
 IZA concept car presented at an IEEE conference in 1997, with four  motors.
 General Motors Sequel 2005
 Protean Electric's Mini QED in 2006, Ford F-150 pickup truck in 2008, and other cars using its Hi-Pa Drive
 Mitsubishi MIEV concept model in 2005
 Chebela (2010), a small urban EV prototype using 2 direct-drive in-wheel motors in the rear.
 Citroën C-Métisse with in wheel electric motors developed by TM4.
 Siemens VDO (bought by Continental) eCorner concept in 2006
 Heuliez WILL using the Michelin Active Wheel (which incorporates motorized active suspension as well) in 2008
 The ZAP-X in 2007 "would use high-tech electric hub motors at all four wheels, delivering 644 horsepower to the ground from a lithium-ion battery pack. The hub motors would eliminate the need for transmission, axles and conventional brakes, opening up space beneath the floor for a giant battery pack."
 The Peugeot BB1 in 2009 incorporates rear in-wheel motors designed with Michelin.
Each wheel integrates a motor, steering actuators, suspension and braking right inside the wheel, controlled by a drive-by-wire system.
 Toyota subsidiary Hino Motors showed a concept 6x6 truck chassis named "FlatFormer" at the 2019 Tokyo Motor Show using technology co-developed with Ree Automotive; later serial-production cars by Ree Automotive use four fully sprung 200 kW motors near each wheel arch.

Railway vehicles
Stored Energy Technology Limited has developed its Wheel Motor for rail use. It has been successfully demonstrated on a Blackpool tram and is core to its Actiwheel torque vectoring concept.

Mechanism
Hub motor electromagnetic fields are supplied to the stationary windings of the motor. The outer part of the motor follows, or tries to follow, those fields, turning the attached wheel. In a brushed motor, energy is transferred by brushes contacting the rotating shaft of the motor. Energy is transferred in a brushless motor electronically, eliminating physical contact between stationary and moving parts. Although brushless motor technology is more expensive, most are more efficient and longer-lasting than brushed motor systems.

A hub motor typically is designed in one of three configurations. Considered least practical is an axial-flux motor, where the stator windings are typically sandwiched between sets of magnets. The other two configurations are both radial designs with the motor magnets bonded to the rotor; in one, the inner rotation motor, the rotor sits inside the stator, as in a conventional motor. In the other, the outer-rotation motor, the rotor sits outside the stator and rotates around it. The application of hub motors in vehicular uses is still evolving, and neither configuration has become standard.

Electric motors have their greatest torque at startup, making them ideal for vehicles as they need the most torque at startup too.  The idea of "revving up" so common with internal combustion engines is unnecessary with electric motors.  Their greatest torque occurs as the rotor first begins to turn, which is why electric motors do not require a transmission.  A gear-down arrangement may be needed, but unlike in a transmission normally paired with a combustion engine, no shifting is needed for electric motors.

Wheel hub motors are increasingly common on electric bikes and electric scooters in some parts of the world, especially Asia.

Comparison with conventional EV design in automobiles
Compared with the conventional electric vehicle design with one motor situated centrally driving two (sometimes four) wheels by an axle or driveshaft, the in-wheel motor arrangement has certain advantages and disadvantages:

Drive by wire

Cars with electronic control of brakes and acceleration for each individual wheel provide more opportunities for computerized vehicle dynamics such as:

 Brake steer, where individual wheel brake bias is adjusted to assist steering (similar to a tracked vehicle like a bulldozer)
 Active software differentials, where individual wheel speed is adjusted in response to other inputs
 Active brake bias, where individual wheel brake effort is adjusted in real-time to maintain vehicle stability

However, these benefits also accrue to vehicles with an in-board motor for each wheel. Wheel assemblies with in-wheel motors can pivot through greater angles than a conventional steering rack allows, and the Protean and REE "corner modules" add steering motors that allow vehicle motion in any direction, called crab steering.

As wheel motors brake and accelerate a vehicle with a single solid-state electric/electronic system many of the above features can be added as software upgrades rather than requiring additional systems/hardware to be installed. This should lead to cheaper active dynamic safety systems for road vehicles equipped with wheel motors.

Weight savings
Eliminating mechanical transmission, including gearboxes, differentials, driveshafts, and axles, provides a significant weight and manufacturing cost saving, while also decreasing the environmental impact of the product.

Unsprung weight concerns
The major disadvantage of a wheel hub motor is that the weight of the electric motor increases the unsprung weight, which adversely affects handling and ride. The wheels are more sluggish in responding to road conditions, especially fast motions over bumps, and transmit the bumps to the chassis instead of absorbing them.

Most conventional electric motors include ferrous material composed of laminated electrical steel. This ferrous material contributes most of the weight of electric motors. To minimize this weight, several recent wheel-motor designs have minimized the electrical steel content of the motor by using a coreless design with Litz wire coil windings to reduce eddy current losses. This significantly reduces wheel motor weight and therefore unsprung weight.

Another method used is to replace the cast iron friction brake assembly with a wheel motor assembly of similar weight. This results in no net gain in unsprung weight and provides a car capable of braking up to 1G.

A good example of this is the Michelin Active Wheel motor as fitted to the Heuliez Will, the first electric car with an Active Wheel drive, which results in unsprung weight of 35 kg on the front axle and which compares favorably to a small car such as a Renault Clio that has 38 kg of unsprung weight on its front axle.

During their research efforts, Protean Electric and Lotus found that most negative effects of added unsprung mass could be eliminated by adding suspension damping, and that the ability to utilize accurate torque vectoring actually improved car's handling so much that the net effect of the whole arrangement was positive.

See also
 ActiveWheel
 Locking hubs
 Direct drive mechanism
 Individual wheel drive

References

External links

 
Electric vehicles
Electric bicycles
Train wheels
Gearless electric drive